Kao Yang-sheng (born 11 July 1952) is a Taiwanese politician.

Early life
Kao obtained his bachelor's degree in philosophy from Fu Jen Catholic University.

Political career
Kao sat in the Legislative Yuan from 1996 to 2002, representing the Highland Aborigine Constituency on behalf of the Kuomintang. Kao was appointed political deputy minister of the Council of Indigenous Peoples on 2 September 2013. He left the CIP on 31 July 2014 to serve as deputy magistrate of Taoyuan County.

References

Aboriginal Members of the Legislative Yuan
Living people
1952 births
Members of the 3rd Legislative Yuan
Members of the 4th Legislative Yuan
Kuomintang Members of the Legislative Yuan in Taiwan
Fu Jen Catholic University alumni